Jan Groenendijk may refer to:
 Jan Groenendijk (footballer)
 Jan Groenendijk (draughts)